Empress Song (952–995) was a Chinese empress consort of the Song dynasty, married to Emperor Taizu of Song.

She came from a royal family. Her maternal grandfather was Later Han's first emperor Liu Zhiyuan. Her paternal grandmother was a daughter of Later Tang's first emperor Li Cunxu.

Titles 

 During the reign of Emperor Gaozu of Later Jin (28 November 936 – 28 July 942):
 Lady Song (宋氏; from 952)
 During the reign of Emperor Taizu of Song (4 February 960 – 14 November 976):
 Empress (賀氏; from 968)
During the reign of Emperor Taizong of Song (15 November 976 – 8 May 997)
Empress Xiaozhang (孝章皇后; from 995)

Ancestry

Notes

995 deaths
Song dynasty empresses
952 births
10th-century Chinese women
10th-century Chinese people
People from Luoyang